The California Honeydrops are an American blues and R&B band, formed in November 2007 playing in the subway stations of Oakland, California, United States.

Crossing genres from roots and blues to R&B and soul, The California Honeydrops' sound is tied together by their instrumentation, vocal harmonies and New Orleans style. The Honeydrops' more unusual instruments include a home-made gutbucket bass, jug, and washboard. Their rhythms are punctuated by trumpet, piano riffs, and bluesy vocals.

History
Born in Warsaw, Poland, band leader and front man Lech Wierzynski started playing blues and jazz as a teenager at after-hours jam sessions in Washington D.C. After studying trumpet with Marcus Belgrave, Wierzynski launched his own career in Oakland. Having accompanied artists such as Maria Muldaur, Dan Hicks, and Jackie Payne, Wierzynski has grown equally adept as a trumpeter, singer, and guitarist.

The rhythm section of The California Honeydrops comprises the barrelhouse style of Oakland piano veteran Chris Burns. Rotating between tub bass, jug, washboard and drums are Nansamba Ssensalo and Ben Malament.

In October 2008, The California Honeydrops set off for their first European tour to play the Rawa Blues Festival in Katowice, Poland as well as shows in Poland, Germany and The Netherlands.

Their first album, Soul Tub!, with all original songs was released in November 2008. Their second album, Spreadin' Honey was released in the summer of 2010. The California Honeydrops played a U.S. & Spain tour in 2012 including appearances at the Portland Waterfront Blues Festival. They released their Like You Mean It on April 19, 2013. The band followed the  release by embarking on their eighth European tour, a West Coast tour, and a performance at New Orleans Jazz Fest.

They released their fifth album on September 11, 2015. The band sold out two nights at The Fillmore in San Francisco in support of the album, and then embarked on a United States tour. They toured Australia for the first time in November 2015, returning in 2017 and 2018 to play ten gigs at Byron Bay Bluesfest.

They opened for Bonnie Raitt on the Spring and Fall legs of her 2016 US Tour. They opened for her again in Hawaii and Australia in the Spring of 2017.

Discography
 Soul Tub!  (Tubtone Records, November 2008)
 Spreadin' Honey  (Tubtone Records, July 2010)
 Honeydrops Live  (Tubtone Records, April 2012)
 Like You Mean It  (Tubtone Records, April 2013)
 A River’s Invitation  (Tubtone Records, September 2015)
 A Higher Degree  (Tubtone Records, 2015)
 Call It Home VOL 1 & 2  (Tubtone Records, 2018)
 Soft Spot (Tubtone Records, 2022)

References

External links
 Official website
 The California Honeydrops on MySpace
 The California Honeydrops on ReverbNation
 Interview with Lech on Down Home Radio
 Press Release on Jazz News
 Live Review on Info Muzyka

Musical groups established in 2007
Musical groups from Oakland, California
American blues musical groups
American soul musical groups
2007 establishments in California